This is a list of international prime ministerial trips made by Ulf Kristersson, the 35th and current Prime Minister of Sweden since 18 October 2022.

Trips

2022

2023

See also 
 Foreign relations of Sweden

References

2022 in international relations
Foreign relations of Sweden
Swedish prime ministerial visits
Lists of diplomatic trips